Strange England is an original novel written by Simon Messingham and based on the long-running British science fiction television series Doctor Who. It features the Seventh Doctor, Ace and Bernice. A prelude to the novel, also penned by Messingham, appeared in Doctor Who Magazine #215.

External links
Strange England Prelude

1994 British novels
1994 science fiction novels
Virgin New Adventures
Novels by Simon Messingham
Seventh Doctor novels
Fiction set in 1873